Becky G is an American singer and actress. Gomez appeared in the short film El Tux (2008) as Claudia Gómez and as Nina in the Discovery Channel television film La estación de la Calle Olvera (2008). Gomez was cast as Trini in the film Power Rangers (2017). She also appeared as Valentina Galindo in two episodes of Empire adding the singles "Do It" and "New, New" (2015). Gomez traveled to Vancouver, Canada, to film Power Rangers. Filming occurred from February 29 to May 28, 2016. Gomez starred in the sci-fi adventure film A.X.L., which was filmed in late 2017; the movie received negative reviews from critics and, like Power Rangers, was a box-office disappointment. Gomez starred in the lead role in the animated fantasy film Gnome Alone, alongside Josh Peck; it was originally slated for release in theaters, but was only released in Latin America, Europe and Asia in April 2018. It was made available in Netflix on October of the same year. 

In November 2021, Gomez began hosting her own Facebook Watch talk show, titled Face to Face with Becky G. Her first guest was American singer Demi Lovato. In March 2022, Gomez joined Joe Jonas and Sean Bankhead to serve as a judges on the MTV & TikTok American music competition series Becoming A Popstar. In May 2022, Gomez starred alongside Machine Gun Kelly, Mod Sun, Dove Cameron and Megan Fox in the critically reviled comedy film Good Mourning.

Filmography

Film

Television

Executive producer

Music videos

Guest appearances

References

External links
 

Videographies of American artists
American filmographies